The Hangzhou Ring Expressway, designated as G2504, is  in Hangzhou, Zhejiang, China.

References

Chinese national-level expressways
Expressways in Zhejiang
Transport in Hangzhou